is a 1958 black-and-white Japanese film directed by Haku Komori and produced by Shintoho.

Cast 
 Kinuko Obata
 Toshio Hosokawa (actor) (細川俊夫)
 James P. Hughes
 Yōko Mihara

See also 
 Soldier Girls, 1981 documentary film
 Soldier's Girl, 2003 film

References

External links 
 

Japanese black-and-white films
1958 films
Films directed by Haku Komori
1950s Japanese films